The Målselva is a river in Målselv Municipality in Troms og Finnmark county, Norway. The municipality and the valley through which the river runs are both named after the river.

The smaller rivers Divielva, Tamokelva, and Rostaelva converge near the Lille Rostavatn lake to form the Målselva river. Later, the river Barduelva joins it near Fossmoen and Bardufoss. The Målselva river passes by the main villages of Bardufoss, Andselv, and Skjold.

References

External links

Målselv
Rivers of Troms og Finnmark
Rivers of Norway